Batman 3 may refer to:

 Batman Forever, the third film in the Tim Burton/Joel Schumacher Batman film series
 The Dark Knight Rises, the third and final installment in The Dark Knight trilogy
 Batman: Arkham Origins, the third installment in the Batman: Arkham series
 Lego Batman 3: Beyond Gotham
 Dick Grayson, the third Batman following Azrael's stint as Batman during "Knightfall"